Pallars Sobirà is a comarca (comparable to a county or shire in much of the English-speaking world) in the mountainous northwest of Catalonia, Spain. The name means "Upper Pallars", distinguishing it from the more populous (and less mountainous) Pallars Jussà to its southwest. Its capital and largest municipality is Sort.

Located in the central Pyrenees, Pallars Sobirà stretches from south to north, starting at the gorge of Collegats to the village of Alós d'Isil, following the course of the river  Noguera Pallaresa. It is the fourth biggest comarca in Catalonia in terms of surface area, and has one of the lowest densities of population in the country, about 5.1 inhabitants per km². All together, it has approximately 7,000 inhabitants.

Pallars Sobirà contains the largest lake in the Pyrenees, the lake of Certascan, and the highest peak in Catalonia, the Pica d'Estats (3,143 m).

Most of Pallars Sobirà is a protected nature reserve. There are a few territories that belong to the PEIN (Pla d'Espais d'Interès Natural de Catalunya- Natural Interest Landscape Plan of Catalonia), as Aigüestortes i Estany de Sant Maurici National Park, the Alt Pirineu Natural Park, the Natural Partial Reserve of La Noguera Pallaresa - Collegats, a wide range of areas belonging to the Natura 2000 network, the Natural Hunting Reserve of Boumort, etc.

Municipalities

See also
County of Pallars Sobirà

References

External links

Official website  
Official Pallars Sobirà Tourism web  
 Information about Pallars Sobirà from the Generalitat de Catalunya 

 
Comarques of the Province of Lleida
Pyrenees